West Perth may refer to:

West Perth, Ontario, a municipality in Ontario, Canada
West Perth, Western Australia, a suburb of Perth, Western Australia
Electoral district of West Perth, a Legislative Assembly electorate in the state of Western Australia
West Perth Football Club, an Australian rules football club in Western Australia